John Christoffel Kannemeyer, better known as J. C. Kannemeyer (31 March 1939 – 25 December 2011) was an authority on Afrikaans literature and a well-known biographer of Afrikaans writers, and published numerous books on the history of Afrikaans literature.

He was born in Robertson, Western Cape, South Africa.

Bibliography

Biographies
 D. J. Opperman: 'n Biografie, Human & Rousseau, 1986
 Wat het geword van Peter Blum?, Tafelberg, 1993
 Die bonkige Zoeloelander, Tafelberg, 1994
 Opperman se lewe in beeld, Tafelberg, 1994
 Die dienswillige dienaar, Tafelberg, 1995
 Langenhoven: 'n Lewe, Tafelberg, 1995
 Leipoldt: 'n Lewensverhaal, Tafelberg, 1999
 Uit die skatkis van die slampamperman, Tafelberg, 1999
 So blomtuin-vol van kleure: Leipoldt oor Clanwilliam, Tafelberg, 1999
 Die lewe en werk van Uys Krige, Die goue seun, Tafelberg, 2002
 Uit die skatkis van die goue seun, Tafelberg, 2002
 Die naamlose muse (Uys Krige opstelle), Protea Boekhuis, 2002
 Jan Rabie: 'n Biografie, Tafelberg, 2004
 Hutspot (a collection of Rabie's scattered articles), T, 2004
 Die volledige versamelde gedigte van Eugène N. Marais, (editor), 2005
 Hannes Van Der Merwe: Argitek en skrywersvriend, Protea Boekhuis, 2006
 Eugène N. Marais, Die siel van die mier, Protea Boekhuis, 2007
 Leroux: 'n Lewe, Protea Boekhuis, 2008
 Briewe van Peter Blum, (Geredigeer en ingelei deur J C Kannemeyer), 2009
 J M Coetzee: 'n Geskryfde, Lewe Jonathan Ball Publishers SA , 2011

Literary Essays
 Opstelle oor die Afrikaanse drama, Academica, 1970
 Konfrontasies, Academica, 1977
 Getuigskrifte, Jutalit, 1989
 Die bevestigende vlam, Jutalit, 1990
 Ontsyferde stene, Inset, 1996
 Uit puur verstrooiing, 2007

Awards
1979: Recht Malan Prize for Geskiedenis van die Afrikaanse literatuur I
1987: Old Mutual Prize for Non fiction for D. J. Opperman
1988: Gustav Preller Prize for Literêre Kritiek
1996: Recht Malan Prize for Langenhoven: 'n Lewe
2000: Recht Malan Prize and Helgaard Steyn Prize for Leipoldt: 'n Lewensverhaal
C. Louis Leipoldt Prize of the Maatschappij der Nederlandse letterkunde for Uys Krige en die Suid-Afrikaanse politiek
2003: N.P. van Wyk Louw Medal
2009 Dr. honoris causa, Stellenbosch University

References

External links
 Biography at stellenboschwriters.com

1939 births
2011 deaths
People from Robertson, Western Cape
Afrikaner people
Afrikaans-language writers
South African writers